Orahovac is a town and municipality in Western Kosovo.

Orahovac may also refer to:

Orahovac (liqueur), a Dalmatian walnut liqueur; see Croatian cuisine